is a sub-kilometer asteroid, classified as a near-Earth object and potentially hazardous asteroid of the Apollo group. It was discovered on 16 November 2011, by astronomers with the LINEAR at the Lincoln Laboratory ETS near Socorro, New Mexico, in the United States.

Orbit
For comparison, the distance to the Moon is about 0.0026 AU (384,400 km).  appears on the list of PHA close approaches issued by the Minor Planet Center (MPC), with the next close approach in the year 2038.

The Jupiter Tisserand invariant, used to distinguish different kinds of orbits, is 5.7.

References

External links 
 
 
 

549948
549948
549948
20111116